Robert Ford Garrison (August 29, 1915 – June 6, 2001), nicknamed "Rocky" and "Snapper", was an American professional baseball player and coach. He appeared in 185 games in Major League Baseball for the Boston Red Sox (1943–44) and Philadelphia Athletics (1944–46).

Career 
Garrison played 1,822 games during a long minor league career (1938–43; 1946–52; 1954–56). The bulk of his Major League playing career took place during World War II — although he missed part of the 1945 season while serving in the United States Navy. In 134 games that year he hit .267 (133-for-498) with four home runs, 39 runs batted in, and 63 runs scored. He tied for tenth in the American League with ten stolen bases and tied for fifth with 19 sacrifice hits.

He played in just six games for the A's in 1945 and in just nine in 1946. In a total of 185 career MLB games, Garrison was 180-for-687 (.262), and 37 walks and two hit by pitches pushed his on-base percentage up to .302.  He had six home runs, 56 RBI, and scored 80 runs.  He was an above-average defensive outfielder for his era, handling 425 out of 431 chances successfully for a .986 fielding percentage.

His minor league career also was interrupted by one season as a Major League coach on the staff of Cincinnati Redlegs manager Rogers Hornsby. Hornsby managed Garrison in 1950 when both were with the Beaumont Roughnecks of the Double-A Texas League.

Garrison died at the age of 85 in Largo, Florida.

References

External links 

Retrosheet

1915 births
2001 deaths
Amsterdam Rugmakers players
Augusta Tigers players
Baseball players from South Carolina
Beaumont Exporters players
Beaumont Roughnecks players
Boston Red Sox players
Cincinnati Redlegs coaches
Fort Worth Cats players
Harlingen Capitals players
Kansas City Blues (baseball) players
Louisville Colonels (minor league) players
Major League Baseball left fielders
Major League Baseball outfielders
Newark Bears (IL) players
Philadelphia Athletics players
Portland Beavers players
Sportspeople from Greenville, South Carolina
United States Navy personnel of World War II